The 1962 FIFA World Cup UEFA–AFC qualification play-off was a two-legged home-and-away tie between the winners of UEFA Group 10, Yugoslavia, and the winners of the AFC final round, South Korea. The matches were played on 8 October and 26 November 1961 in Belgrade and Seoul, respectively.

After beating South Korea in both matches (5–1 in Belgrade and 3–1 in Seoul), Yugoslavia won the tie and qualified for the World Cup.

Teams

Venues

Standings

Matches

First leg

Second leg

References

Play-off Uefa-Afc
1962
FIFA
Yugoslavia national football team matches
South Korea national football team matches
October 1961 sports events
November 1961 sports events
1960s in Belgrade
1960s in Seoul
International sports competitions in Belgrade
Sports competitions in Seoul
International association football competitions hosted by Yugoslavia
International association football competitions hosted by South Korea